The Embassy of the United States of America in Jerusalem is the diplomatic mission of the United States of America to the State of Israel, located in the Talpiot neighborhood of Jerusalem. In mid-October 2018, the United States Secretary of State Mike Pompeo announced that the embassy in Jerusalem would be merging with the US Consulate-General in Jerusalem into a single mission. Relations with the Palestinians would still be conducted through the special Office of Palestine Affairs inside the Embassy.

History

Background
The Embassy opened at its Jerusalem location on May 14, 2018, the 70th Gregorian anniversary of the creation of the modern State of Israel. It was relocated from its previous site in Tel Aviv by the Trump Administration and is situated in what was previously the former US Consulate in the Arnona neighborhood. The opening prayer was delivered by the Evangelical Reverend Robert Jeffress, and the closing prayer was given by the Evangelical Reverend John C. Hagee.

The move came 23 years after the passage of the Jerusalem Embassy Act of October 23, 1995, which set a deadline of May 31, 1999, for the move. The Clinton, Bush, and Obama administrations had all deferred the move. Eugene Kontorovich claimed that the decision to shift the US embassy to this area is tantamount to the United States recognizing Israeli sovereignty over land that it captured in the Six-Day War in 1967.

However, despite the move of the Embassy to Jerusalem, President Trump signed on June 4, 2018 an executive order postponing the move of the Embassy to Jerusalem, although it already moved to that city. He was required to sign the order since the Jerusalem Embassy Act requires the US Ambassador to have a permanent residence in Jerusalem, a condition not yet fulfilled.

Impact of move

On December 18, 2017, in a 14–1 vote, the US vetoed a United Nations Security Council draft resolution on the matter then on December 21, 2017 the United Nations General Assembly passed a resolution by a 128–9 vote. Palestinian officials warned that it could lead to an "inactive war" and violent protests. The Embassy's opening coincided with the bloodiest day of the 2018 Gaza border protests, with more than 57 Palestinians killed. French Minister of Europe and Foreign Affairs Jean-Yves Le Drian said, "This decision contravenes international law and in particular the resolutions of the Security Council and the UN General Assembly". On September 28, 2018, Palestine brought a case against the US at the International Court of Justice alleging that the relocation of the embassy breached the Vienna Convention on Diplomatic Relations and other rules of general international law. The International Court of Justice asked for briefs covering jurisdiction and admissibility, Palestine's submission by May 15, 2019, the US by November 15, 2019.

The opening of a new US Embassy in Jerusalem led two other countries to move their embassies to Jerusalem. Two days after the US Embassy opened, Guatemala moved its embassy to Israel back to Jerusalem. Paraguay also opened a Jerusalem embassy to Israel, citing the US precedent. A new Paraguayan President Mario Abdo Benitez took office on August 15, 2018 and on September 5, 2018, Paraguay's Foreign Minister Luis Alberto Castiglioni announced that the Paraguay embassy would be relocated back to Tel Aviv.

Merger with the US Consulate-General
On October 18, 2018, United States Secretary of State Mike Pompeo announced that the US would be merging the Embassy and US Consulate General in Jerusalem into a single mission. The United States will continue conducting relations with the West Bank and Gaza through a newly-created Palestinian Affairs Unit which will operate from the Agron Site of the Jerusalem Embassy. While the decision was praised by the Israeli Government, Palestinian officials criticized the Trump Administration for siding with Israel's claim to Jerusalem and "Greater Israel". In February 2019, it was announced that the US Consulate General would be formally merging into the US Embassy in March.

On March 4, 2019, the US Consulate-General was formally integrated into the US Embassy in Jerusalem. The Consulate-General's Agron Street premises will be revamped as the Palestinian Affairs Unit, which will handle many of the Consulate-General's former functions. This ends the US practice of assigning separate diplomatic missions to the Israelis and Palestinians. In response, Saeb Erekat, the secretary-general of the Palestine Liberation Organization's Executive Committee called for the international community to boycott the new Palestinian Affairs Unit. Erekat's sentiments were echoed by fellow Executive Committee member Hanan Ashrawi, who denounced the merger of the Consulate General as "political assault on Palestinian rights and identity". Ashrawi's visa request to the United States was subsequently denied.

International Court of Justice case — Palestine v. United States of America 

In September 2018, the State of Palestine initiated an action in the International Court of Justice, in the case Palestine v. United States of America (officially titled Relocation of the United States Embassy to Jerusalem), in which Palestine charges the US with violating the Vienna Convention on Diplomatic Relations by moving its embassy from Tel Aviv to Jerusalem, arguing the Convention requires that "the diplomatic mission of a sending State must be established on the territory of the receiving State." The Palestinian application argues that in international law Jerusalem cannot be considered to be the territory of the State of Israel because under General Assembly Resolution 181 of 1947 (the Partition Plan) Jerusalem was to have been placed under international governance, which thus precludes it from being considered under the sovereignty of any State.

The case also involves the question of the statehood of Palestine, as under the Statute of the International Court of Justice "only States may be parties in cases before the Court." The US has refused to participate in a meeting at the Court and has not submitted its legal brief. Palestine has submitted its brief, which as of August 2020 has not been made public.

Location

The United States Embassy is located in what was previously the U.S. Consulate General in Jerusalem's Arnona neighborhood. The space houses the ambassador and a 50-member staff. The ambassador splits his time between the US Embassy in Jerusalem and the Tel Aviv Embassy Branch Office, where many diplomatic functions are still be conducted.  Most consular functions of the former consulate were subsumed under embassy authority.

The embassy straddles the 1949–67 Armistice line in Jerusalem, located partially in West Jerusalem and partially in no man's land. A senior United Nations official stated: "Under international law it is still occupied territory, because neither party had any right to occupy the area between the lines".

At a briefing on 18 January, Ned Price, Department Spokesperson for the Department of State, said the US is considering two options for the embassy facility, the Allenby site and the Arnona site, but that no decision has been made. Price was responding in relation to recent reports that the embassy was to be built on "land illegally expropriated from Palestinians".

United States Office of Palestine Affairs
The former US Consulate General in Jerusalem's Agron Street premises has been repurposed as the US Embassy Palestinian Affairs Unit, which is responsible for conducting a range of reporting, outreach and programming in the West Bank, Gaza Strip, and with Palestinians in Jerusalem. Senior Foreign Service Officer Mike Hankey, who is fluent in Arabic and French, has been designated as the first Head of the Palestinian Affairs Unit. 

In June 2022, the Palestinian Affairs Unit was re-designated as the U.S. Office of Palestine Affairs. While this office is still considered part of the US Embassy in Jerusalem, it reports directly to the State Department, signifying an upgrade to the state of US-Palestinian bilateral relations. It is headed Senior Foreign Service Officer George Noll, who had served as the head of the Palestinian Affairs Unit since August 2020.

At the end of November 2022, the US reiterated a promise, after 2 years of delay, to reopen the re-open the U.S. consulate in Jerusalem. As of January 2023, the Biden administration has not met this pledge.

See also

 Consulate General of the United States, Jerusalem
 Tel Aviv Branch Office of the Embassy of the United States
 Israel–United States relations
 Palestine–United States relations
 List of diplomatic missions of the United States

References

External links

 

Jerusalem
United States
Israel–United States relations
State of Palestine–United States relations
2018 establishments in Israel